Uendel Pereira Gonçalves (born 8 October 1988), simply known as Uendel, is a Brazilian professional footballer who plays as left back for Cuiabá.

Career
Born in Araranguá, Uendel began his career in the youth team of Criciúma, in 2007 he ascended to the professional squad and was one of the highlights of the Santa Catarina State League and calling Fluminense's attention.

At the time spent in Rio he didn't have many opportunities and because of that he signed with Avaí. He won the State League and had a great campaign in the 2009 Brazilian Serie A, taking the place in the first team leaving Eltinho as his substitute.

After playing only one match in the Brazilian Série A he signed with Grêmio, but with little space in the club, Uendel moved to Flamengo on loan until the end of 2011.

On 14 March 2021, Uendel left Internacional and signed for Cuiabá, newly promoted to the top tier.

Career statistics

Honours
Avaí
Campeonato Catarinense: 2009, 2010

Corinthians
Campeonato Brasileiro Série A: 2015

Cuiabá
Campeonato Mato-Grossense: 2021

Individual
Campeonato Catarinense Best XI: 2010

References

External links

1988 births
Living people
Brazilian footballers
Association football defenders
Campeonato Brasileiro Série A players
Campeonato Brasileiro Série B players
Campeonato Brasileiro Série C players
Criciúma Esporte Clube players
Fluminense FC players
Avaí FC players
Grêmio Foot-Ball Porto Alegrense players
CR Flamengo footballers
Associação Atlética Ponte Preta players
Sport Club Corinthians Paulista players
Sport Club Internacional players
Cuiabá Esporte Clube players